Farès Brahimi (born 22 October 1988 in Réghaïa) is an Algerian footballer who plays as a midfielder.

Personal life
Brahimi was born on 22 October 1988, in Réghaïa, Algiers Province. At age two, he moved with family to France. He has both Algerian and French citizenship.

Career

Early career
Brahimi emerged through Saint-Étienne's youth system, but made no appearances for the first team during his stint; he played regularly for the reserves, in the Championnat de France amateur. In 2007–08, Farès appeared regularly for US Cognac. In June 2008 he signed a contract with US Feurs.

Minyor Pernik
Following a trial period in November 2010, Brahimi signed a contract with Bulgarian club Minyor Pernik on 1 February 2011. He made his A Professional Football Group debut on 27 February, as a second-half substitute in a 3–0 home loss against Litex Lovech. Farès quickly became a regular in the starting eleven and scored two goals to the end of the 2010–11 season.

Montana
On 16 January 2013, Brahimi joined Montana on free transfer for the rest of the season.

MO Béjaïa
On 10 January 2014, Brahimi joined MO Béjaïa on free transfer for the rest of the season.

Career statistics
(Correct )

References

External links

Profile at dzfoot.com

1988 births
Living people
Algerian footballers
PFC Minyor Pernik players
FC Montana players
Association football midfielders
First Professional Football League (Bulgaria) players
Expatriate footballers in Bulgaria
Algerian expatriate footballers
Algerian emigrants to France
People from Réghaïa
Algerian expatriate sportspeople in Bulgaria